The eighth season of 7th Heaven—an American family-drama television series created and produced by Brenda Hampton—premiered on September 15, 2003, on The WB, and concluded on May 17, 2004 (23 episodes).

Cast and characters

Main
Stephen Collins as Eric Camden
Catherine Hicks as Annie Camden
Beverley Mitchell as Lucy Camden-Kinkirk
Mackenzie Rosman as Ruthie Camden
Nikolas and Lorenzo Brino as Sam and David Camden
George Stults as Kevin Kinkirk
Ashlee Simpson as Cecilia Smith
Rachel Blanchard as Roxanne Richardson
Jeremy London as Chandler Hampton
Scotty Leavenworth as Peter Petrowski
Tyler Hoechlin as Martin Brewer
Happy as Happy the Dog

Recurring
David Gallagher as Simon Camden (7 episodes)
Barry Watson as Matt Camden (5 episodes)
Jessica Biel as Mary Camden (1 episode)

Episodes

References

2003 American television seasons
2004 American television seasons